This is a list of settlements in Croatian Baranja sorted alphabetically by city and municipality with their respective populations. All of the following towns and municipalities and their settlements are located completely in Baranja. The only exception is the City of Osijek which has 2 of its 11 settlements located completely in Baranja (Podravlje and Tvrđavica) and a small part of one (Osijek).

Towns and cities

Town of Beli Manastir

Beli Manastir, population 8,049
Branjin Vrh, population 993
Šećerana, population 540
Šumarina, population 486

total town population: 10,068

City of Osijek 

Osijek (only a small part of the settlement on the left bank of the Drava river is located in Baranja)
Podravlje, population 357
Tvrđavica, population 578

Municipalities

Municipality of Bilje

Bilje, population 5,642
Kopačevo, population 559
Kozjak, population 60
Lug, population 764
Podunavlje, population 1
Tikveš, population 10
Vardarac, population 630
Zlatna Greda, population 5

total municipal population: 5,642

Municipality of Čeminac

Čeminac, population 968
Grabovac, population 872
Kozarac, population 730
Mitrovac, population 20
Novi Čeminac, population 319

total municipal population: 2,909

Municipality of Darda

Darda, population 5,323
Mece, population 882
Švajcarnica, population 196
Uglješ, population 507

total municipal population: 6,908

Municipality of Draž

Batina, population 879
Draž, population 505
Duboševica, population 554
Gajić, population 294
Podolje, population 140
Topolje, population 395

total municipal population: 2,767

Municipality of Jagodnjak

Bolman, population 520
Jagodnjak, population 1,299
Majške Međe, population 82
Novi Bolman, population 122

total municipal population: 2,023

Municipality of Kneževi Vinogradi 

Jasenovac, population 35
Kamenac, population 166
Karanac, population 926
Kneževi Vinogradi, population 1,657
Kotlina, population 288
Mirkovac, population 108
Sokolovac, population 14
Suza, population 567
Zmajevac, population 853

total municipal population: 4,614

Municipality of Petlovac 

Baranjsko Petrovo Selo, population 525
Luč, population 435
Novi Bezdan, population 300
Novo Nevesinje, population 63
Petlovac, population 714
Sudaraž, uninhabited 
Širine, population 58
Torjanci, population 276
Zeleno Polje, population 43

total municipal population: 2,405

Municipality of Popovac 

Branjina, population 322
Kneževo, population 803
Popovac, population 959

total municipal population: 2,084

References 

Baranya (region)

Places in Croatian Baranja